The 2012 Champions League Twenty20 (CLT20) was the fourth edition of the Champions League Twenty20, an international Twenty20 cricket tournament. It was held in South Africa from 9 to 28 October 2012. This edition was significant for being the first to feature a Pakistani team.

This was the first season to have Karbonn Mobiles as the title sponsor. They replaced Nokia, who withdrew from their four-year deal after just one year.

The Sydney Sixers emerged the winners of the tournament, defeating the Highveld Lions in the final.

Background

In Twenty20 cricket
Since the previous edition, three Test-playing nations introduced new premier Twenty20 tournaments. Australia created the Big Bash League, which began in December 2011. Compared to the previous KFC Twenty20 Big Bash, it has city-based franchise teams, more matches and allows two overseas players in the team. It was very well received with high attendance and good television viewership. The inaugural season of the Sri Lanka Premier League was held in August 2012 and also featured new privately owned city-based franchise teams and participation from overseas players. Sri Lanka's previous Twenty20 tournament had a low profile and a primary focus on providing opportunities for players. Bangladesh, the lowest ranked in Test cricket, created the Bangladesh Premier League, their first premier Twenty20 tournament, in February 2012. However, their teams were not considered for the CLT20.

Other nations made no major changes to their tournaments. South Africa's MiWay T20 Challenge included a new team to give exposure to more players but was disbanded after the season.

In the four weeks directly preceding the CLT20, the only international cricket played was in the Twenty20 format, including the 2012 ICC World Twenty20, which ran for 20 days and ended 2 days before the CLT20 started.

Team preparation
As preparations for the tournament, the Trinidad and Tobago team will play two Twenty20 competitions, both held at their home ground of Queen's Park Oval in Port of Spain, Trinidad and Tobago. They competed in the "Twenty20 for 50" competition, held 24 to 26 August and also involving Jamaica and two all-star teams—the Daren Ganga XI and the Brian Lara XI. T&T won the competition and all their matches. From 6 to 8 September, T&T will play the "Asia vs the Caribbean" tournament also involving the national teams of Barbados, Afghanistan and Bangladesh. T&T, Afghanistan and Bangladesh were tied first with two wins each but came third on net run rate. The T&T government also offered $5 million in funding to prepare the team for the tournament.

During the Sialkot Stallions' preparations, they encountered issues when the Pakistan Cricket Board appointed Naushad Ali to replace Naeem Akhtar as team manager. The team were unhappy with the decision as Akhtar had held the position for a long time and knew the team well. The decision affected team morale and their preparations. The PCB then replaced Ali with Zaheer Abbas.

Format
The tournament will feature a qualifying stage, introduced in the 2011 edition. As with all previous editions, the tournament format was changed: only two teams qualify from the qualifying stage to the group stage.

Six teams participate in the qualifying stage, from which two teams advance to the group stage to join eight direct entrants. The top four teams from the group stage advance to the knockout stage. The qualifying and group stages have the teams divided into two equal groups, with each playing a round-robin tournament, and the top two teams of each group advance to the next stage. The knockout stage consists of two semi-finals, with the top team of one group facing the second from the other. The winners of the semi-finals play the grand final to determine the winners of the competition.

Points awarded in the qualifying and group stages:

Prize money
Same as previous editions, the total prize money for the competition is US$6 million. In addition to the prize money, each team receives a participation fee of $500,000. The prize money will be distributed as follows:

$200,000 – Each team eliminated in the group stage
$500,000 – Each semi-finalist
$1.3 million – Runners-up
$2.5 million – Winners

Qualification
This tournament will feature a team from Pakistan for the first time. Pakistan's participation had not been considered for past editions of the tournament due to the hostility between India and Pakistan since the 2008 Mumbai attacks. The attacks were also responsible for the cancellation of the planned first edition of the tournament in 2008, for which a Pakistan team had qualified.

Representation from Australia changes to teams from the Big Bash League, which replaced their previous premier Twenty20 tournament and features new city-based teams instead of the previous first-class teams. Similarly, representation from Sri Lanka changes to teams from the Sri Lanka Premier League, which features franchise teams. While the 2011 edition had the fourth-placed Indian team play the qualifying stage, this year's team, the Mumbai Indians, directly qualified for the main tournament on account of being the defending champions.

Teams
This edition did not feature the Royal Challengers Bangalore, who participated in all the previous editions. The New South Wales Blues, who won the 2009 tournament, no longer play Twenty20 cricket. However, the Sydney Sixers contain many former Blues players in their squad, including nine who were in the Blues' squad from the 2011 tournament.

Squads

As with previous editions, several players qualified for the tournament with multiple teams, allowing them to play for the teams of their choosing. Should a player decline the option of playing for his "home" team, his chosen team must pay the "home" team a compensation fee of $150,000. Nine players were nominated in preliminary squad of more than one team and all of them chose to play for their Indian Premier League teams. As a result, teams lost players who helped them qualify for the tournament. Amongst these teams, Trinidad and Tobago were very determined to have Kieron Pollard, Dwayne Bravo and Sunil Narine represent them (their national team) instead of their IPL teams. The T&T government offered to match the higher match fees given by the IPL teams as compensation. In June, T&T sports minister Anil Roberts announced that the players wanted to play for T&T and were close to signing memorandums of understanding. All three players eventually chose to play for their IPL teams despite their efforts.

Venues
The organisers originally considered hosting the tournament at five venues across India: Kolkata, Chennai, Hyderabad, Bangalore and New Delhi. This was later changed due to the possibility of monsoons and Durga Puja celebrations and the organisers chose South Africa as the host. The teams that qualified through the Indian Premier League were opposed to this idea as it would likely affect their revenue, which is dependent on television viewership. The venues are: Cape Town, Johannesburg, Centurion and Durban.

Fixtures
All times shown are in South African Standard Time (UTC+02).

Warm-up matches

Qualifying stage

Pool 1

Pool 2

Group stage

Group A

Group B

Knockout stage

Semi-finals

Final

Final standings

Statistics

Most runs

Most wickets

Criticism and controversy
The changes to the tournament format were met with criticism from the Trinidad and Tobago team. The changes resulted in the Mumbai Indians receiving a spot in the group stage previously given to a team from the qualifying stage, leaving Trinidad and Tobago with a lesser chance of advancing to the group stage. The Mumbai Indians were given the spot on account of being the defending champions. The eight teams receiving direct entry are all from India, Australia and South Africa, the three countries arranging the tournament. These teams were selected instead of Trinidad and Tobago despite their good performances in past editions and their win–loss record—the best in the history of the tournament.

On 28 August, Lalit Modi, the former chairman of both the IPL and the CLT20, claimed on Twitter that the Board of Control for Cricket in India were "arm twisting" to make Kieron Pollard, Dwayne Bravo and Sunil Narine play for their IPL teams instead of their national team of Trinidad and Tobago. Modi claimed the BCCI threatened to withdraw Trinidad and Tobago's invitation to participate in the tournament and threatened the players with their IPL contracts.

References

External links
page on IPL11 Site
Tournament site on ESPN Cricinfo
Tournament site on ndtvsports.com

{{|date=November 2018|bot=InternetArchiveBot |fix-attempted=yes }}
2012
Champions League Twenty20
South African domestic cricket competitions